The Glums  is a British television sitcom which first aired on ITV in 1979. It had its origins in a segment of the 1950s radio show Take It from Here. The characters were revived as part of Bruce Forsyth's Big Night variety show in 1978, and the following year were given a spin-off which lasted for one series of eight episodes. Frank Muir and Denis Norden adapted their original radio scripts for the series.

Main cast
 Jimmy Edwards as  Father
 Ian Lavender as Ron
 Patricia Brake as Eth
 Michael Stainton as  Ted the landlord

References

Bibliography
 Morgan-Russell, Simon. Jimmy Perry and David Croft. Manchester University Press, 2004.
 Slide, Anthony. Wake Up At The Back There: It's Jimmy Edwards. 2018.

External links
 

1979 British television series debuts
1979 British television series endings
1970s British comedy television series
ITV sitcoms
English-language television shows